Ciao! is the fourth studio album from Swedish pop music artist Mauro Scocco. It was released in 1992 on Scocco's own record label Diesel Music.

Four singles were released from this album: "Om du var min" (If You Were Mine), "Nelly", "Mitt liv" (My Life), and "Rymdraket" (Space Rocket). The album peaked at number three on the Swedish Albums Chart.

Track listing 

"Rymdraket" – 4:37
"Mitt liv" – 4:19
"Nelly" – 4:12
"Även rosor vissnar" – 4:37
"Blind" – 3:15
"Varför" – 5:04
"Om du var min" – 6:30
"Perfekt" – 3:48
"En del har ingenting" – 3:32
"Nästan där" – 4:58

Charts

External links
 mauroscocco.se (requires login)

References

Mauro Scocco albums
1992 albums
Swedish-language albums